The 2017–18 Australian Athletics Championships was the 96th edition of the national championship in outdoor track and field for Australia. It was held from 15 to 18 February 2018 at Carrara Stadium in Gold Coast, Queensland. It served as the selection meeting in athletics events for Australia at the 2018 Commonwealth Games. Distance events were held separately, with the 10,000 metres taking place at the Zatopek 10K on 14 December 2017 at Lakeside Stadium in Melbourne and the 10,000 metres race walk was held in Canberra on 14 January 2018.

Medal summary

Men

Women

References

External links 
 Athletics Australia website

2018
Australian Athletics Championships
Australian Championships
Athletics Championships
Sports competitions on the Gold Coast, Queensland
2010s in Queensland